The Samuel G. Reed House is a house located in southwest Portland, Oregon, listed on the National Register of Historic Places.

See also
 National Register of Historic Places listings in Southwest Portland, Oregon

References

External links
 

1908 establishments in Oregon
Bungalow architecture in Oregon
Houses completed in 1908
Houses on the National Register of Historic Places in Portland, Oregon
Southwest Hills, Portland, Oregon
Portland Historic Landmarks